Shane Brennan (born 1957 in Bendigo, Victoria, Australia) is an Australian television writer and producer, best known as the executive producer of the American CBS drama NCIS, as well as the creator of the NCIS spin-off series, NCIS: Los Angeles.

Brennan's other television credits include Special Squad, The Flying Doctors, All Together Now, King & Maxwell, State Coroner, Stingers, Flipper, CSI: Miami, and Summerland. Beginning as a journalist for the Australian Broadcasting Corporation (ABC), by 1981, he had abandoned journalism for television scriptwriting.

From the mid-1990s he worked on American cable shows shot in Australia – of which Flipper is the only named example in the IMDB. That gave him exposure, friends in the U.S. and an agent. As he said, "I started travelling backwards and forwards for about five years – usually four or five times a year, coming for two or three weeks at a time, doing lots and lots of meetings, all at my expense."

In 2003, Brennan became supervising producer for CSI: Miami, and then went on to succeed Donald P. Bellisario as the showrunner on NCIS, handing the day-to-day showrunner operations over to Gary Glasberg after season 8. He then created and became the showrunner of NCIS: Los Angeles, while remaining an executive producer of NCIS until the end of the eleventh season. His last credited episode as executive producer of NCIS was the season 11 finale episode, "Honor Thy Father". In 2011, his production company signed a deal with CBS.

In July 2016, it was announced that Brennan was stepping down as showrunner of NCIS: Los Angeles and that he was handing the reins over to R. Scott Gemmill. In February 2022, it was announced that Brennan would lead a new NCIS: Sydney set in Sydney.

Brennan was elected president of the Australian Writers' Guild in January 2019.

Filmography

Film

Television
The numbers in writing credits refer to the number of episodes.

References

1957 births
Living people
Australian expatriates in the United States
American television producers
American television writers
American male television writers
Australian television producers
Australian television writers
People from Bendigo
Date of birth missing (living people)
CSI: Miami
NCIS (franchise)
Australian male television writers